Victoria Gres (born 1964) is a Ukrainian fashion and costume designer. She and other designers are considered to be some of the first Ukrainian fashion designers to emerge after Ukraine gained independence as a country.

Gres began her career in fashion design around 1996. Her collections have been featured in Ukraine, Russia, the United States, and Canada. Her designs are regularly featured during Ukrainian Fashion Week. 

Gres' fashion shows are often inspired by films or literary and musical works. In 2014, she staged a show at the Ukrainian Fashion Week to protest the war. In 2019, during the Victoria Gres brand's 26th anniversary, she hosted a fashion show inspired by fairy tales.

In 2008, Gres was a costume designer for the Janet Jackson's Rock Witchu Tour. In 2014, she designed the inauguration dress for the First Lady of Ukraine Maryna Poroshenko. The garment was a silk lavender coat dress with Ukrainian embroidery on the hem and sleeves. It was worn during the first part of the day, during the swearing in ceremony for the President of Ukraine Petro Poroshenko at the Verkhovna Rada and at the Saint Sophia Cathedral, Kyiv.

References

1964 births
Living people
20th-century Ukrainian women artists
21st-century Ukrainian women artists
Ukrainian fashion designers
Russian fashion designers
Russian women fashion designers
Ukrainian women fashion designers